Mount Hope, California may refer to:
Mount Hope, California, former name of Hayden Hill, California
Mount Hope, San Diego, California